Goodia lotifolia, commonly known as golden tip or clover tree,  is a shrub species in the pea family, Fabaceae. It is endemic to south-eastern Australia.  Plants grow to 4 metres and have trifoliate leaves. Yellow flowers appear in racemes in spring. The seed pods are  around 25 mm long. The species was first formally described in 1806 by botanist Richard Salisbury in The Paradisus Londinensis. Two varieties are currently recognised:

Goodia lotifolia Salisb. var. lotifolia Goodia lotifolia var. pubescens'' (Sims) H.B.Will.

The species occurs in Queensland, New South Wales, Victoria and Tasmania.

See also
Penambol Conservation Park

References

Mirbelioids
Fabales of Australia
Flora of New South Wales
Flora of Queensland
Flora of Tasmania
Flora of Victoria (Australia)